Ṭabaqāt al-Ḥanābilah is a biographical dictionary covering Hanbali scholars, written by Ibn Abi Ya'la (d. 1131 AD).  The book starts from the life of the founder Ahmad ibn Hanbal himself. Later Al-Hafiz Ibn Rajab (d. 1393 AD) wrote a sequel to this book under the name Continuation of the history of the Hanbalites (Dhayl ‘alá Ṭabaqāt al-Ḥanābilah). The Continuation covers those who died after 460 AH. Modern publishing may available in 4 volumes where two volumes is original book by Ibn Abi Ya'la and following two volumes from Ibn Rajab addition.

See also 
 Tabaqat

References

 
 

Hanbali
Biographical dictionaries
1370 works